Mbarara University School of Medicine (MUSM),  also known as Mbarara University Medical School (MUMS) is the school of medicine of Mbarara University of Science and Technology, one of Uganda's public universities. The medical school was founded in 1989, the same year that the university was established.

Location
The school's campus is located on the premises of Mbarara Regional Referral Hospital, in the city of Mbarara, in Mbarara District, Western Uganda. The coordinates of the medical school are:0°37'00.0"S, 30°39'27.0"E (Latitude:-0.616667; Longitude:30.657500).

Overview
Mbarara University School of Medicine constitutes the Faculty of Medicine at Mbarara University. The faculty is headed by a Dean, who is deputized by a Deputy Dean. The teaching discipline of the medical school are integrated with the regional referral hospital. The hospital's consultants and registrars, and interns also serve as teaching staff for the university's medical students.

Uganda's first female neurosurgeon, Juliet Sekabunga Nalwanga, trained there.

See also

References

External links
 Mbarara University Homepage
 Mbarara Medical School Homepage

Medical schools in Uganda
Educational institutions established in 1989
Mbarara University of Science and Technology
1989 establishments in Uganda